Santa Ynez Fault is a left-reverse fault in Santa Barbara County of California.  Its length is at least 130 km., running through Santa Ynez and north of nearby Santa Barbara.  The Santa Ynez Mountains were uplifted within the last 5 million years, mostly along this fault, which marks the north slope of the range.

References

External links
 USGS Fault Map
 Southern California Earthquake Data Center: Santa Ynez Fault

Seismic faults of California
Geology of Santa Barbara County, California
Santa Ynez Mountains
Santa Ynez Valley
Santa Barbara, California
Geography of Santa Barbara County, California